Alejandro Nones (born December 9, 1982) is a Venezuelan actor. He began his acting career with the film Así del precipicio, and later was hired by Televisa to act in the telenovela Lola, érase una vez.

Filmography

References

External links 

Venezuelan male television actors
Venezuelan male models
21st-century Venezuelan male actors
Living people
Venezuelan male film actors
Male actors from Caracas
1982 births